The Ontario New Democratic Party elects its leaders by secret ballot of the party members and/or their delegates at leadership elections, as did its predecessor, the Co-operative Commonwealth Federation (Ontario Section).  The party leader can be challenged for the leadership at the party's biennial convention. The Ontario New Democratic Party is a social democratic political party in Ontario, Canada.

From 1934 until 1942, the president of the Ontario CCF acted as the party's spokesperson and leader during election campaigns. John Mitchell, a Hamilton alderman, was CCF president from 1934 until 1941. Samuel Lawrence, former Ontario CCF MPP for Hamilton East was elected party president in 1941 and recommended that the party elect a leader in 1942.

Ontario Co-operative Commonwealth Federation

1942 leadership convention

(Held on April 3, 1942, at the Hotel Carls-Rite in Toronto)

Ted Jolliffe
Murray Cotterill

Fifteen other individuals were nominated but declined to stand including Ontario CCF President and former Hamilton East MPP Samuel Lawrence; Allan Schroeder of St. Catharines; York West Member of Parliament Joseph W. Noseworthy; Canadian United Steelworkers of America executive director Charles Millard, lawyer Andrew Brewin; former Member of Parliament Agnes MacPhail; Toronto alderman William Dennison, CCF National Secretary David Lewis; University of Toronto professor and Toronto school trustee George Grube; teacher Everett Orlan Hall of London, Ontario; Alderman and former party president John Mitchell of Hamilton; B.E. Leavens of Toronto; Lou Isaacs; William Grant of Peterborough, and Margaret Sedgewick of Toronto.

(Note:  The vote totals were not announced. 150 delegates participated in total.)

1946 leadership challenge
(Held November 23, 1946)

Ted Jolliffe
Lewis Duncan

1953 leadership convention

(Held at the Royal Canadian Legion Hall on College Street, in Toronto, on November 21, 1953.)

Former MPPs Agnes Macphail, Eamon Park, Charles Millard, and William Dennison were nominated as was sitting MPP and CCF house leader Bill Grummett but all declined.

(Note:  These totals are taken from an interview with Donald C. MacDonald several years after the convention.  They do not appear to have been announced at the convention itself.)

Ontario New Democratic Party

1961 leadership convention

(Held on October 8, 1961, at the Sheraton-Brock Hotel in Niagara Falls, Ontario)

Donald C. MacDonald acclaimed

1968 leadership challenge

(Held on November 17, 1968, at Bingeman Park in Kitchener, Ontario.)

1970 leadership convention

(Held at the Royal York Hotel in Toronto on October 4, 1970.)

1972 leadership challenge

(Held on December 10, 1972, at the Four Seasons Sheraton Hotel in Toronto, Ontario.)

An additional 137 ballots were spoiled. If the spoiled votes are factored in then Lewis received 74.2% support overall

1978 leadership convention

(Held on February 5, 1978, at the Sheraton Centre in Toronto.)

Breaugh eliminated, goes to Cassidy

1982 leadership convention

(Held at the Harbour Castle Convention Centre in Toronto on February 7, 1982.)

1986 leadership challenge

(Held on June 22, 1986, at Copps Coliseum in Hamilton, Ontario.)

1996 leadership convention

(Held on June 22, 1996, at Copps Coliseum in Hamilton, Ontario.)

After the first ballot, Silipo was eliminated and he endorsed Hampton. After the 2nd ballot, Kormos was eliminated but he endorsed no one and released his delegates. There were eighty spoiled ballots on the final count, mostly from disgruntled supporters of Kormos.

Ballot results

2009 leadership election

(Held on March 7, 2009, at Copps Coliseum in Hamilton, Ontario)

Prue eliminated, endorses Bisson

Bisson eliminated, endorses Horwath

Starting with the 2009 leadership election, the Ontario NDP instituted a modified one member one vote system in which the vote is calculated so that ballots cast by labour delegates have 25% weight in the total result, while votes cast by party members have a weight of 75% in the overall result.

2023 leadership election

(Held on February 4, 2023, at the Metro Toronto Convention Centre in downtown Toronto)

Marit Stiles acclaimed

References

Leadership
 
New Democratic Party provincial leadership elections